La donna serpente (The Snake Woman) is a 1932 opera by Alfredo Casella to a libretto by Cesare Vico Lodovici based on the fable, La donna serpente, by Carlo Gozzi. The same fable was the basis of Wagner's first opera, Die Feen. The plot concerns a king, Altidòr, who falls in love with a fairy, Miranda. The fairy's father curses Altidòr that if he curses Miranda, she shall turn into a snake.

Recordings
La donna serpente (LP) Mirto Picchi, Magda Laszlo, Renata Mattioli, Luisella Ciaffi, Coro di Milano della Rai, Giulio Bertola. Orchestra Sinfonica di Milano della Rai, Fernando Previtali, 1959
La donna serpente (DVD) Angelo Villari, Zuzana Marková, Vanessa Goikoetxea, Anta Jankovska, Candida Guida, Orchestra Internazionale d'Italia, Fabio Luisi ; Bongiovanni, 2014
La Donna Serpente (DVD) Piero Pretti, Carmela Remigio, Erika Grimaldi, Francesca Sassu, Anna Maria Chiuri, Marco Filippo Romano, Orchestra del Teatro Regio di Torino, Gianandrea Noseda

External links 
 Libretto of La Donna Serpente on operalibretto.com

References

Operas
1932 operas
Italian-language operas
Compositions by Alfredo Casella
Operas based on works by Carlo Gozzi